The Frederick and Della Dunn House is a historic house located at 145 North Main Street in Springville, Utah.

Description and history 
The one-story, Period Revival style cottage was constructed in 1929, and was designed by architect Claude Ashworth (1885–1971). It has one story above ground but also has a full basement. It includes Spanish Colonial Revival architecture, though other influences are evident in various aspects of its design.

It was listed on the National Register of Historic Places on August 3, 1990.

See also
Springville High School Art Gallery, in Springville, Utah, also NRHP-listed and a work of Claude Ashworth

References

Spanish Colonial Revival architecture in the United States
Houses completed in 1929
Houses on the National Register of Historic Places in Utah
Mission Revival architecture in Utah
Houses in Utah County, Utah
National Register of Historic Places in Utah County, Utah
Buildings and structures in Springville, Utah
Individually listed contributing properties to historic districts on the National Register in Utah